Ikepod is a  wristwatch manufacturer specializing in conceptual  timepieces. Originally Swiss made, the watches are currently made in Hong Kong with  Miyota quartz movements.

History
The Ikepod is a Swiss watch company founded in 1994 by Oliver Ike and Marc Newson and famous for its cult disc-shaped design watches. The Ikepods were among the first watches to start the wave of big diameter design watches in the millennial years with cases in gold, silver, steel, platinum and titanium  and exclusive limited edition watch conceptions bordering on the limits of art.

Newson and Ike have since left the company and the brand was bought in April 2017 by three new investors in Mauborget Switzerland. The new CEO, Christian-Louis Col, has announced that the new Ikepods have maintained the original design elements but have overcome the technical complications of the original Ikepod cases. Furthermore, the Ikepods will no longer be produced in Switzerland but in Hong Kong with Japanese Miyota quartz movements to make them more affordable.

The new Ikepods were designed in Switzerland by Emmanuel Gueit, the Swiss watch designer responsible for the Audemars Piguet Royal Oak Offshore. The new Ikepods include a time-only 42mm watch called the Duopod and a chronograph model in a 44mm case called the Chronopod. The new models are based on the original Ikepod Horizon and Hemipode models. The new Ikepods feature the same  elliptic forms, cases in 316L steel and the original silicone hyperallergenic straps. The company states that its Duopods and Chronpods wear more like 39mm and 41mm watches because of the lack of external lugs and the way the case tapers at the edges.  Ikepod  relaunched   on Kickstarter on 18 September 2018.

Clientele
Kanye West owns an Ikepod.

References

External links
Official

Watch manufacturing companies of Switzerland
Swiss watch brands